Funky Town (stylized FuNKYToWN) is the debut studio album by Kenyan alternative hip hop group Camp Mulla. It was released on September 29, 2012. News of the album first came out on the group's WordPress blog on 17 April 2012, the same day the music video for "Hold It Down", the first single from the album, was released on YouTube.

The album gained wide publicity when Camp Mulla performed at the opening of the 2012 Safari Sevens on September 22, 2012 to promote it. It was believed that the group had officially released their album during the performance.

Track listing

Sources:

References

External links
 Funky Town on Waabeh.com
 Official website

Camp Mulla albums
2012 albums